Brux is a commune in the Vienne department and Nouvelle-Aquitaine region of western France.

See also
Communes of the Vienne department

References

External links

 Tourism in  Brux

Communes of Vienne